Zenia is an unincorporated community in Trinity County, California, United States. Zenia has a post office with ZIP code 95595, which opened in 1899.

History

Zenia was first named 'Poison Camp' by men who went there in the 1860s after larkspur in the area poisoned their cattle. Postmaster George Croyden named the community Zenia after a girl.

Zenia is home to the historic Seven Cedars homestead founded in 1902.

See also
Trinity County, California

References

Unincorporated communities in California
Unincorporated communities in Trinity County, California